Ethan Allen Blackaby (July 24, 1940 – January 16, 2022) was an American professional baseball player who was an outfielder in Major League Baseball, appearing in 15 games for the Milwaukee Braves during the 1962 and 1964 seasons.

Born in Cincinnati, Ohio, Blackaby attended Canton, Illinois, High School, where he was a multi-sport standout athlete. He played baseball and football at the University of Illinois at Urbana–Champaign before signing with the Braves in 1961. His nine-year professional career included 1,073 games in minor league baseball, punctuated by his two trials with the Braves in the closing weeks of the 1962 and 1964 campaigns, when MLB rosters expanded to 40 players. In his debut on September 6, 1962, he doubled in his first MLB at bat against Ernie Broglio of the St. Louis Cardinals. He had entered the game as a pinch hitter for Braves' catcher Bob Uecker, who later became both a film and television actor and Baseball Hall of Fame play-by-play broadcaster.  Blackaby collected only two other hits in the majors, both singles, in 25 at bats over his two brief trials.

After his playing days were over, Blackaby was part-owner and general manager of the Phoenix Giants of the Triple-A Pacific Coast League in the 1970s and early 1980s.

Blackaby died on January 16, 2022, at the age of 81.

References

External links 

1940 births
2022 deaths
Atlanta Crackers players
Austin Braves players
Baseball players from Cincinnati
Birmingham A's players
Boise Braves players
Denver Bears players
El Paso Sun Kings players
Hawaii Islanders players
Illinois Fighting Illini baseball players
Illinois Fighting Illini football players
Major League Baseball outfielders
Minor league baseball executives
Milwaukee Braves players
Oklahoma City 89ers players
People from Canton, Illinois
Richmond Braves players
Salt Lake City Bees players
Seattle Angels players
Toledo Mud Hens players
Yakima Braves players